This is a list of notable persons of the Marathi Buddhist community worldwide. Marathi Buddhists are mainly Ambedkarite Buddhists, who are followers of B. R. Ambedkar. Marathi Buddhists constitute more than 77% of the total Buddhist population in India.

Academics
 Narendra Jadhav, economist, educationist and author
 Shankarrao Kharat, Vice Chancellor of BAMU Aurangabad
 Bhalchandra Mungekar, economist and author
 Sharmila Rege, sociologist, feminist scholar and author of Writing Caste, Gender
 Anand Teltumbde, scholar, writer and civil rights activist
 Sukhadeo Thorat, economist and author

Businesspeople
 Milind Kamble, national president of Dalit Indian Chamber of Commerce and Industry
 Kalpana Saroj (born 1961), entrepreneur and a Tedx speaker

Entertainers
 Nagraj Manjule, director, filmmaker 
 Kushal Badrike, actor and comedian
 Siddharth Jadhav, actor
 Usha Jadhav, actress
 Bhalchandra Kadam, actor, comedian
 Abhijeet Kosambi, singer
 Vaishali Mhade, singer
 Surekha Punekar, Indian folk artist
 Abhijeet Sawant, actor and singer
 Adarsh Shinde, singer and musician
 Prahlad Shinde, singer
 Smita Tambe, actress
 Vitthal Umap, singer
 Somnath Waghmare, documentary filmmaker and researcher

Lawyers

 B. R. Ambedkar (1891–1956), jurist, barrister, and first Law and Justice Minister of India
 R. D. Bhandare (born 1916), governor of Bihar and Andhra Pradesh
 Bhushan Gavai (born 1960), justice in the Supreme Court of India
 B. C. Kamble (born 1919), jurist and lawyer

Politicians
 Anandraj Ambedkar, political activist
 Prakash Ambedkar, Member of Parliament
 Yashwant Ambedkar, member of MLC 
 Ramdas Athawale,  state minister of India, and Member of Parliament
 Rajkumar Badole, Social Justice and Assistance Minister, Maharashtra
 Sanjay Bansode, state minister of Maharashtra
 Sharad Bansode, Member of Parliament
 Murlidhar Chandrakant Bhandare, Governor of Odisha
 R. D. Bhandare, Governor of Bihar and Andhra Pradesh
 Bhaurao Gaikwad, Member of Parliament
 Eknath Gaikwad, MP and state minister
 Sunil Gaikwad, Member of Parliament
 Varsha Gaikwad, School Education Cabinet Minister of Maharashtra
 Prakash Gajbhiye, Member of MLC
 R. S. Gavai, Governor of Bihar And Kerala, Member of the parliament, Former Chairman of Maharashtra Legislative Council
 Rajendra Gavai, political activist
 Chandrakant Handore, state minister of Maharashtra
 Ramratan Janorkar, Mayor of Nagpur
 N. M. Kamble, Indian politician
 Jogendra Kawade, cabinet minister, and Member of the Maharashtra Legislative Assembly
 B. D. Khobragade, Deputy Chairman of the Rajya Sabha
 Sulekha Kumbhare, minister
 Avinash Mahatekar, State Minister of Maharashtra
 Laxman Mane, political activist
 Waman Meshram, President Of Bahujan Kranti Morcha
 Nitin Raut, cabinet minister and MLA
 Dadasaheb Rupwate, politician
 Tukaram Shrangare, Union Minister For State For Communications
 Sudhakar Tukaram Shrangare, Member of Parliament
 Nashikrao Tirpude, 1st Deputy Chief Minister of Maharashtra
 Balkrishna Ramchandra Wasnik, Member of Parliament for Bhandara and Buldhana
 Mukul Wasnik, Minister for Social Justice and Empowerment

Sportspeople
Mona Meshram, cricketer
Avinash Sable, athlete

Writers and activists
 Savita Ambedkar (1909–2003), social activist and writer
 Baburao Bagul, writer and poet
 Datta Bhagat, author
 Suresh Bhat (1932–2003), poet
 Raja Dhale (1940–2019), social activist and writer
 Namdeo Dhasal (1949 2014), social activist and writer
 Laxman Gaikwad, novelist
 Arun Kamble, writer and social activist
 Namdeo Kamble, writer, social worker, journalist and teacher
 Uttam Kamble, journalist and author
 Vaman Kardak, poet and playwright
 Shankarrao Kharat, writer and member of the Maharashtra Legislative Council
 Sharankumar Limbale, author
 Yashwant Manohar, poet and writer
 Keshav Meshram, poet
 Bhau Panchbhai, poet, writer and activist
 Gangadhar Pantawne, writer, reviewer and Ambedkarite thinker 
 Dagdu Maruti Pawar, writer and poet
 Pradnya Daya Pawar, poet and fiction writer
 Urmila Pawar, writer and activist
 Uttam Kamble, journalist and author

See also

 List of Buddhists
 Marathi Buddhists
 List of converts to Buddhism
 List of converts to Buddhism from Hinduism

References

Lists of Indian people by community
Buddhists
 Marathi
Marathi
Buddhists